Weinfelden railway station is a railway station in the Swiss canton of Thurgau and the municipality of Weinfelden. The station is located on the Winterthur–Romanshorn railway line, at its junctions with the Mittelthurgau-Bahn lines to Wil and Konstanz.

Weinfelden station is an intermediate stop on long-distance services from Brig to Romanshorn and Lucerne to Konstanz. It is also the terminus of Zürich S-Bahn services S24 and S30, together with services of the St. Gallen S-Bahn.

Services 
 the following services stop at Weinfelden:

 Zürich S-Bahn
: peak-hour service between Zürich main station and  via .
 St. Gallen S-Bahn:
 : half-hourly service to Konstanz.
 : service every two hours to Konstanz.

References

External links 
 

Railway stations in the canton of Thurgau
Swiss Federal Railways stations